Anya Singh (born 29 December 1992) is an Indian actress who made her debut in Bollywood film Qaidi Band (2017). After making her acting debut as a minor artist, Singh played her first leading role in Habib Faisal's musical drama film Qaidi Band in 2017, alongside Aadar Jain.

Filmography
Films

Television series

Notes

Footnotes

References

External links

Actresses in Hindi cinema
Indian film actresses
1992 births
Living people